The 1934 Northeastern Huskies football team represented Northeastern University of Boston, Massachusetts, during the 1934 college football season. It was the program's second season and they finished with a record of 6–1–1. Their head coach was Alfred McCoy and their captain was Richard Mitchell.

Schedule

References

Northeastern
Northeastern Huskies football seasons
Northeastern Huskies football